James Anthony Morrow Jr. (September 22, 1923 - September 11, 1990) was an American attorney, cattle farmer, and Democratic politician. He was a member of the Mississippi House of Representatives from 1952 to 1988.

Biography 
James Anthony Morrow Jr. was born on September 22, 1923, in Clovis, New Mexico. His father, James A. Morrow Sr., was a member of the Mississippi House of Representatives from 1936 to 1944. Morrow Jr. graduated from Brandon High School and the Jackson School of Law. He served in the Merchant Marines and U. S. Navy in World War II. Morrow first became a member of the Mississippi House of Representatives in 1952. He served continuously until 1988, having decided not to run for re-election in 1987. He died on September 11, 1990, in Brandon, Mississippi.

References 

1923 births
1990 deaths
People from Brandon, Mississippi
Democratic Party members of the Mississippi House of Representatives